Philippines National Historic Landmarks is a registry of historic sites in the Philippines that have been officially declared by the Philippine Registry of Cultural Property.

There appear to be about 120 of them, as of August 2018. These are:
Session Hall of the Senate of the Philippines
Bradford Memorial Church
Manila Bay and Waterfront from Del Pan Bridge to the Cultural Center of the Philippines
Embassy of the Philippines - Tokyo
Zapote Battlefield
Fort Pikit
Old Iloilo City Hall
Simbahan ng San Joaquin
Simbahan ng Dauis
Simbahan ng Molo
Casa de Comunidad de Tayabas
Church of Tabaco
Leyte Provincial Capitol
Simbahan ng Loon
Simbahan ng Ivana
Church, Convent and Site of the Beaterio of Sabtang
Old Legislative Building (now National Museum) (try Old Legislative Building and National Museum and Ang Pambansang Museo)
Miag-ao Church Historical Landmark
Bahay Nakpil-Bautista
Quezon Provincial Capitol Building
Cebu Provincial Capitol
Baptistry of the Church of Calamba
Dauis Church Complex
Church of San Agustin
Church of San Sebastian Historical Landmark  (try Church of San Sebastian)
Church of Paete
Simbahan ng Dumangas
Ang Kapilya ng Ermita
Rosendo Mejica Historical Landmark (try Rosendo Mejica)
Bantayan ng Punta Cruz
President Carlos P. Garcia House
Simbahan ng Lazi
MacArthur Landing Site/Leyte Landing Site  (try MacArthur Landing Site and Leyte Landing Site)
Katedral ng Maasin
Intramuros and its Walls
Birthplace of Antonio Luna  (try Antonio Luna)
Church of the Holy Sacrifice
P. Burgos Elementary School Historical Landmark (try P. Burgos Elementary School )
Filipino-Japanese Friendship Historical Landmark
First Rizal Monument in the Philippines
Wenceslao Vinzons Historical Landmark
Cuartel de Santo Domingo
Corregidor
Labanan sa Imus
Parola ng Malabrigo
Taal Church Historical Landmark (try Taal Church )
Church of Baler Historical Landmark (try Church of Baler ) 
Birthplace of General Gregorio del Pilar
Teodoro Brillantes House
Gen. Juan Araneta Historical Landmark ( try Gen. Juan Araneta )
Gen. Aniceto Lacson Historical Landmark (try Gen. Aniceto Lacson )
Belfry of the Jaro Cathedral
Vicente Manansala Historical Landmark (try Vicente Manansala )
Ang Sigaw ng Pugadlawin
Birthplace of Felix Y. Manalo ( Felix Y. Manalo )
Simbahan ng Boac
Capas Concentration Camp
Church of Abucay
Church of Lubao
Balantang Memorial Cemetery
Elks Club Building Historical Landmark
Army and Navy Club Building
Paciano Rizal House
Battle of Alapan
Torogan House
President Diosdado P. Macapagal Museum and Library (Diosdado P. Macapagal)
The Tejeros Convention (Casa Hacienda and its Environs) ( Tejeros Convention, Casa Hacienda )
Simbahan Parokya ng Quipayo
Baldomero Aguinaldo Historical Landmark ) Baldomero Aguinaldo )
Miguel Malvar Historical Landmark ( Miguel Malvar )
Barasoain Church Historical Landmark ( Barasoain Church )
Leon Apacible Historical Landmark ( Leon Apacible )
Marcela Agoncillo Historical Landmark ( Marcela Agoncillo), birthplace of Doña Marcela Mariño de Agoncillo, maker of the first Philippine Flag.
Nagcarlan Underground Cemetery Historical Landmark ( Nagcarlan Underground Cemetery )
Portion of the Town of Taal ( Town of Taal, Taal )
Parola ng Cape Melville
Church of Pan-ay
Church, Convent, and Cemetery of Barotac
Malacañang Palace
Luneta Hotel
Town Center of Pila ( Town of Pila, Pila)
Town Center of Malolos ( Town of Malolos, Malolos )
Mehan Gardens
Fuerte De La Conception Y Del Triunfo
Plaza Libertad
Parola ng Bagacay Point
Jose P. Laurel Monument, Batangas ( Jose P. Laurel, Jose P. Laurel Monument )
Sergio Osmeña House Historical Landmark ( Sergio Osmeña House Historical Landmark )
Birthplace of Father Jacinto Zamora ( Jacinto Zamora )
Mansion House
Surrender Site of General Tomuyuki Yamashita ( Tomuyuki Yamashita, Surrender of General Yamashita )
Old Casa Real and Provincial Capitol of Pangasinan
Simbahan ng Sta. Maria
Church of Bacarra
Church of Paoay
Battle Site Memorial of Pulang Lupa
Bank of the Philippine Islands
Dapitan - Liwasan ng Dapitan ) Liwasan ng Dapitan )
Sheik Karimul Makhdum Mosque
Iwahig Penal Prison and Farm (Iwahig Penal Prison, Iwahig Penal Colony)
Simbahan ng Baclayon
Simbahan ng Boljoon
Ramon Magsaysay Historical Landmark ( Ramon Magsaysay )
Bonifacio Trial House
Church of San Pedro Apostol (Loboc Church) ( Church of San Pedro Apostol, Loboc Church )
Ang Tahanan Ng Pamilyang Aquino
Simbahan ng Santisima Trinidad ng Loay
Manila Hotel
Church of Nuestra Senora De La Consolacion (Argao Church) ( Church of Nuestra Senora De La Consolacion, Argao Church )
Mausoleo de los Veteranos de la Revolucion
Simbahang Immaculada Conception ng Tamontaka
Parola ng Bojeador
Negros Occidental Provincial Capitol
Manila Metropolitan Theater
Pinaglabanan Memorial Shrine
Church of San Guillermo de Aquitania (Dalaguete Church) ( Church of San Guillermo de Aquitania, Dalaguete Church )
Silliman University
Rizal National Monument
Mabini Shrine, PUP ( Mabini Shrine )
Seminary of Nueva Caceres
Mercado Mansion
Ang Dakong Balay (Don Florencio Noel House), (Ang Dakong Balay, Don Florencio Noel House )
Silva House
Balay na Tisa (Sarmiento-Osmeña House) ( Balay na Tisa, Sarmiento-Osmeña House )
Philippine Military Academy

Notes

External links
The Philippine Registry of Cultural Property (PRECUP)

References

Lists of Cultural Properties of the Philippines